Dover station was an elevated rapid transit station located above Washington Street at Dover Street (now East Berkeley Street) in the South End neighborhood of Boston, Massachusetts. It served the Washington Street Elevated, part of the MBTA's Orange Line, from 1901 until 1987.

East Berkeley Street station, a street-level bus station on the Washington Street branch of the MBTA Silver Line bus rapid transit service, opened on the site in 2002. It is served by the SL4 and SL5 Silver Line routes as well as several local MBTA bus routes. Like all Silver Line stops, East Berkeley Street is accessible.

History

The Washington Street Elevated, including Dover station, opened as part of the Main Line Elevated on June 10, 1901. It was originally built with a short center island platform, similar to Northampton station to the south. Like most of the other Elevated stations, both were designed in a Beaux Arts style by Alexander Wadsworth Longfellow, Jr. Mere months after opening, both stations had their platforms extended for four-car trains. Eleven years later, Dover was rebuilt with two eight-car-long side platforms in a more utilitarian style, with the new station opening on December 9, 1912. A temporary wooden station was used during construction.

The Main Line Elevated was renamed the Orange Line in 1965. Dover station was closed on April 30, 1987, when the Washington Street Elevated was closed and the Orange Line was rerouted to the west along the Southwest Corridor. Silver Line service on Washington Street began on July 20, 2002, replacing the route 49 bus. Service levels increased on October 15, 2009 with the introduction of the SL4 route.

References

External links

MBTA: Washington St @ E Berkeley St northbound and southbound

Railway stations in Boston
Orange Line (MBTA) stations
Former MBTA stations in Massachusetts
Silver Line (MBTA) stations
Railway stations in the United States opened in 1901
Railway stations closed in 1987